Intyrictis ("MacIntyre's weasel") is an extinct genus of placental mammals from extinct subfamily Didymictinae within extinct family Viverravidae, that lived in North America during early Paleocene.

Phylogeny
The phylogenetic relationships of genus Intyrictis are shown in the following cladogram:

See also
 Mammal classification
 Didymictinae

References

Viverravids
Paleocene mammals
Paleocene mammals of North America
Prehistoric placental genera